The 2014 Belk Bowl was a college football bowl game that was played on December 30, 2014, at Bank of America Stadium in Charlotte, North Carolina in the United States.  The thirteenth annual Belk Bowl, it matched the Georgia Bulldogs of the Southeastern Conference against the Louisville Cardinals of the Atlantic Coast Conference. The game started at 6:45 p.m. EST and aired on ESPN. It was one of the 2014–15 bowl games played at the conclusion of the 2014 FBS football season. The game was sponsored by Charlotte-based department store chain Belk. The Bulldogs won the matchup by a final score of 37–14.

Teams
The game featured the Georgia Bulldogs of the Southeastern Conference against the Louisville Cardinals of the Atlantic Coast Conference. Georgia was runner-up in the SEC Eastern Division, whereas Louisville was third in the ACC Atlantic Division.

The game represented the first overall meeting between these two teams.

Georgia Bulldogs

After finishing their regular season with a 9–3 record, the Bulldogs accepted their invitation to play in the game.

Georgia became the first representative of the SEC to ever play in the Belk Bowl. In addition to this being Georgia's first Belk Bowl, it was also the Bulldogs' 50th bowl game in program history.

Louisville Cardinals

After finishing their regular season with a 9–3 record, the Cardinals accepted their invitation to play in the game.

The game was Louisville's second Belk Bowl; before they joined the ACC, the Cardinals played in the 2011 game (the first under the bowl's current name and sponsorship), losing to the NC State Wolfpack by a score of 31–24.

Game summary

Scoring summary

Source:

Statistics

Records
According to UGA, "Nick Chubb was named the Belk Bowl MVP and finished with 269 yards and two touchdowns on 33 carries. His 269 yards was a career-high, SEC bowl record, marked his eighth-straight 100-yard rushing game and was the second-highest single game rushing total in Georgia history." Also, a 41-yard field goal by Marshall Morgan that gave the Bulldogs a 30-14 lead set a single-season record for Georgia in points scored. Including the bowl game, UGA scored 537 points over the course of the season.

Chubb also set three Belk Bowl records: rushing attempts, rushing yards, and "Longest Non-Scoring Run" (82 yards).

References

Belk Bowl
Duke's Mayo Bowl
Georgia Bulldogs football bowl games
Louisville Cardinals football bowl games
Belk Bowl